Romantico is the fourth studio album from the Filipino rock band, Kamikazee. It has 14 tracks and released under Universal Records in March 2012 and released on iTunes on April 12, 2012. An 8-track promotional CD was released on October 14, 2011. This was Kamikazee's final studio album before going on hiatus beginning 2016.

The album spawned four singles: "Halik" ("Kiss"), "Tagpuan" ("Meeting Place"), "Huling Sayaw" ("Last Dance"), and "Wo-Oh". "Huling Sayaw", which featured R&B Royalty Kyla, won "Favorite Rock Video" at the 8th MYX Music Awards. It was also nominated for "Favorite Collaboration".

Track listing 
All songs written by Kamikazee except "If You're Not Here" written by Menudo and "Tamis" written by ConcreteSam.

Personnel 
Jay Contreras (vocals)
Jomal Linao (guitars/backing vocals)
Led Tuyay (guitars/backing vocals)
Puto Astete (bass)
Bords Burdeos (drums)

References 

http://www.gig.ph/event/kamikazee-romantico-album-launch-sm-mall-of-asia-grounds/
http://www.homeescapade.com/romantico-by-kamikazee-album-review/
http://lifestylebucket.com/music/pinoy-rock-band-kamikazee-showing-their-romantic-side-on-their-new-album-romantico/
http://universalrecph.blogspot.sg/2012/03/kamikazees-romantico-album-cover.html
http://www.abs-cbnnews.com/entertainment/01/31/15/kamikazee-will-not-be-breaking-after-all
http://www.philtv.ph/kamikazee-not-disbanding/

2011 albums
Kamikazee albums